Collectanea Topographica et Genealogica is an eight-volume miscellany of previously unpublished material related to genealogy collated by Sir Frederic Madden (1801–1873), Rev. Bulkeley Bandinel (1781–1861) and John Gough Nichols (1806–1873), that was published quarterly from 1834.

The editors' own summary of the contents of all eight volumes appeared at the end of the final volume, page 457.

Contents
Volume 1 (1834): 	
Details of the sales of bishops' lands
Church notes from Staveley and Crich in Derbyshire
Extracts from Parish Registers
Extensive family trees showing marriages between nobility and royalty
Volume 2 (1835): 	
Details of roll of arms
Registers
Pedigrees
Deeds
Wills
List of monastic chartularies
Volume 3: 	
Registers
Pedigrees
Deeds
An evaluation of the estates of the bishoprics of England and Wales
Descriptions of banners, standards, and badges from Edward III ro Henry VIII
Volume 4: 	
Roll of arms
Pedigrees
Funeral certificates
Burials
Parish register extracts
Deeds
Charters
Wills
Volume 5: 	
Parish register extracts
Wills
Baptisms
Burials
Deeds
Epitaphs
Pedigrees
Names of pilgrims from England to the Vatican in Rome
Volume 6: 	
Pedigrees
Charters
An abstract of a chartulary of Hexham Abbey
Additions to Dugdales's baronage
Volume 7: 	
Pedigrees
Registers
Memorials
Church Notes
Muster Rolls
Transcripts and Extracts of Wills
Volume 8 (1843): 	
Pedigrees
Church Notes
Residents in Warwick
Wills
Burials
Contents Pages for all Eight Volumes

Sources
http://genealogyreviews.co.uk/fhmdec06_collect.htm

British genealogy